Chenapian (Chenap) is a Papuan language of East Sepik Province, Papua New Guinea. It is spoken in Chepanian (Sanapian) village, Ambunti Rural LLG.

Pronouns
Chenapian pronouns:

{| 
!  !! sg !! du !! pl
|-
! 1
| an || ser || sam
|-
! 2m
| nan || nay || nam
|-
! 2f
| nin ||  || 
|-
! 3m
| tow || tey || tom
|-
! 3f
| ti ||  || 
|}

References

Wogamus languages
Languages of East Sepik Province